Hebecnema umbratica is a fly from the family Muscidae. It is the type species of the genus Hebecnema.

Description
See Morphology of Diptera for terms.
Eyes densely long· (male) or short- (female) haired. The abdomen, seen from behind,
with (male) rather dense grey dusting and a sharply defined narrow median dark line, or (female) with thin dusting and a broader, less sharply defined dark median area and faint shifting dark spots. The female thorax, seen from in front, with 4 faint but more or less distinct darker stripes; frontal triangle, seen from slightly behind, usually extending almost to lunule. 3.5–6 mm.

References

Muscidae
Diptera of Europe
Insects described in 1826